Boy Meets Girl is a BBC Two sitcom starring Rebecca Root, Harry Hepple and Denise Welch. It tells the story of the developing relationship between 26-year-old Leo (Hepple) and 40-year-old Judy (Root). The script, by Elliott Kerrigan, was discovered through the Trans Comedy Award, a 2013 BBC talent search for scripts with positive portrayals of transgender characters.

Both Root and her character Judy are transgender, making this the first BBC comedy to feature transgender issues prominently, and the first sitcom to star a transgender actor. Sophie Clarke-Jervoise, the executive producer, stated "we always knew we had to get a trans actress – I don't think we auditioned anyone who wasn't trans for the role. It just didn't feel right."

The first series of six episodes aired between 3 September and 8 October 2015. A second and final series began airing from 6 July to 4 August 2016. It comprises six episodes.

Episodes

Background and production 
In January 2012, All About Trans organized an event, "Trans Camp", involving people from the trans community and media, and aiming to help the media provide accurate depictions of transgender people. Off the back of this, the BBC ran a talent search later that year, the Trans Comedy Award, offering comedy writers up to £5000 for scripts with positive portrayals of transgender characters. The BBC received 320 script entries, with the winners being Boy Meets Girl (then titled Love) by Elliott Kerrigan and Nobody's Perfect by Tom Glover.

Boy Meets Girl was created by Elliott Kerrigan, and written by Kerrigan, Simon Carlyle, and Andrew Mettam. It stars Rebecca Root as Judy, Harry Hepple as Leo, Denise Welch as Pam (Leo's mother). Also appearing are Janine Duvitski, Nigel Betts, Lizzie Roper, and Jonny Dixon. It is directed by Paul Walker. The producer is Margot Gavan Duffy, and the executive producers are Sophie Clarke-Jervoise for Tiger Aspect and Kristian Smith for the BBC.

A pilot episode was shown at the BBC's Salford Sitcom Showcase in March 2014, and the show was commissioned after that. The main series acquired co-writers Simon Carlyle and Andrew Mettam, and had six 30-minute episodes (including the pilot episode with some re-shot scenes) set and recorded in Newcastle upon Tyne.

The theme tune is "Meet Me on the Corner" by Lindisfarne.

Reception 
After the pilot episode aired, The Independent compared Boy Meets Girl to Gavin & Stacey, an award-winning BBC comedy from 2007–2010, a comparison the BBC had said they were looking to make.

On the topic of having a trans woman character played by a trans woman, Paris Lees wrote in The Guardian "About bloody time" and "It's great to see trans folk bringing authenticity to roles ... [Comedy] is at its best when it helps us to understand a complex and often cruel world by laughing at our own, previously unexamined, prejudices. I haven't seen Boy Meets Girl yet, but it has already put a smile on my face."

Jasper Rees in the newspaper The Telegraph was rather less impressed, describing the show as "packaged in a demoralisingly traditional form of comedy".

See also 

 Boy Meets Girl (2014)
 Different for Girls (1996)
 Transgender in film and television

References

Further reading 
  – Blog entry by the series' creator in the BBC Writers Room blog.
  – Background from one of the organizations involved with the initial script writing competition on the process of getting the show made.
  – Blog entry by one of the show's stars on the creation process.

External links 
 
 
 
 

2015 British television series debuts
2016 British television series endings
2010s British sitcoms
2010s British LGBT-related comedy television series
BBC television sitcoms
British LGBT-related sitcoms
English-language television shows
Television series by Endemol
Television series by Tiger Aspect Productions
Television shows set in Newcastle upon Tyne
Transgender-related television shows
Transgender in the United Kingdom
2010s LGBT-related sitcoms